Botia rostrata, the Gangetic loach, ladder loach, or twin-banded loach, is a freshwater fish belonging to the loach family Botiidae. It originates in calmer water pool areas of highland streams in the lower Ganges and Brahmaputra basins in Bangladesh and north India. Records from elsewhere are believed to be misidentification of relatives (e.g., B. histrionica). It is not as common in the aquarium trade as the clown loach or yoyo loach.

In the aquarium

It needs to be in a group of five or more to create a pecking order and is never seen when kept singly. During fighting or feeding time a larger specimen of this fish may be seen graying out (darkening in body) as a dominance behavior. It likes having plenty of hiding spots and crannies to cram into, so rocks and wood are needed.

References 

Botiidae
Fish of Bangladesh
Fish of India
Fish described in 1868
Taxa named by Albert Günther